also known as Hayami Handa, was a professional Go player.

Biography 
Handa grew up as Tamejiro Suzuki's disciple. He started as a pro in the Nihon Ki-in, but after the Kansai Ki-in's founding, he joined Utaro Hashimoto in the Kansai-Kiin. He became a 9p in 1959.

Titles & runners-up

References

1915 births
1974 deaths
Japanese Go players